Ivan Blažević (born 25 July 1992 in Zagreb) is a Croatian football midfielder, currently playing for NK Bratstvo Kunovec.

Club career
In July 2020, Blažević joined Croatian amateur club NK Bratstvo Kunovec.

References

External links

Ivan Blažević at Sportnet.hr 

1992 births
Living people
Footballers from Zagreb
Association football midfielders
Croatian footballers
Croatia youth international footballers
NK Inter Zaprešić players
Hibernians F.C. players
Croatian Football League players
First Football League (Croatia) players
Maltese Premier League players
Croatian expatriate footballers
Expatriate footballers in Malta
Croatian expatriate sportspeople in Malta